Delias aganippe, the wood white or red-spotted Jezebel, is a butterfly in the family Pieridae.

Distribution
This species is endemic to Australia. These butterflies can be found mainly in southern Queensland, New South Wales, Victoria, South Australia, and in the southern Western Australia.

Description
The upper surface of the wings shows a silver-grey color, with black margins and a row of white spots. Moreover the females have a round black spot in the middle of the forewinhìgs. In both sexes the under surface of the hindwings shows large yellow patches and subterminal bands of red spots.

Biology
They are at first pale brown with a black head, then they become completely black, with small white spots. They feed gregariously on Santalaceae (Exocarpos, Santalum species) and  Loranthaceae species (Amyema species).

References

Butterflies described in 1805
aganippe